Pierre Doris (1919–2009) was a French actor and humorist.

Selected filmography

 Comme un cheveu sur la soupe (1957) - Le chasseur du 'Néant'
 Love Is at Stake (1957) - Le publiciste
 Le triporteur (1957) - Le voyageur à la deux-chevaux
 En légitime défense (1958) - Le patron de Dora / Adrienne
 Mimi Pinson (1958) - Le présentateur
 Cigarettes, Whiskey and Wild Women (1959, by Maurice Régamey) - Gustave
 The Bureaucrats (1959) - Léonce
Julie the Redhead (1959) - L'hôtelier / Hotel Manager
 Business (1960) - Papillon
 Fortunat (1960) - M. Dubroc
 Le Sahara brûle (1961) - Joubert
 Dans la gueule du loup (1961)
 In The Water... Which Makes Bubbles!... (1961) - Le boy-scout camionneur
 L'empire de la nuit (1962) - Le chef du gang des cabarets
 People in Luck (1963) - Sam Chips (segment "Une nuit avec une vedette")
 Le motorizzate (1963) - Lola's Client (segment "La Roulotte Squillo")
 The Bread Peddler (1963) - Le vendeur de journaux
 Le bon roi Dagobert (1963) - Césaric la Crapule
 Cherchez l'idole (1964) - Le disquaire
 L'assassin viendra ce soir (1964) - Inspecteur Bourdier
 Requiem pour un caïd (1964) - Le patron de l'hôtel Monaco
 Clémentine chérie (1964) - Gaston Bellus
 The Counterfeit Constable (1964) - Un français dans le bus
 The Gorillas (1964) - Le représentant en vins
 Déclic et des claques (1965) - Philippe
 La bonne occase (1965)
 Les mordus de Paris (1965)
 Whisky y vodka (1965) - Ivan Gorin Ivanovish, URSS Ambassador
 Le petit monstre (1965)
 Trois enfants... dans le désordre (1966) - L'impresario de zoé
 La Permission (1968) - Peasant / Le paysan
 Bruno, l'enfant du dimanche (1969) - Le chef de la publicité
 Slogan (1969)
 Aux frais de la princesse (1969) - Le préfet
 La guerre des espions (1972) - Le réalisateur
 Le führer en folie (1974) - Colonel
 Mais où sont passées les jeunes filles en fleurs (1975) - L'épicier
 Les petits dessous des grands ensembles (1976) - Le colonel
 Le jour de gloire (1976) - Etienne Machu
 Freddy (1978) - Papa-Gigot
 Si vous n'aimez pas ça, n'en dégoûtez pas les autres (1978) - Un spectateur
 La ville des silences (1979) - Le commissaire
 San-Antonio ne pense qu'à ça (1981) - Bérurier
 Ça va faire mal (1982) - Le vétérinaire
 On n'est pas sorti de l'auberge (1982) - L'homme d'affaires
 Julien Fontanes, magistrat (1983, TV Series, by Serge Friedman) - René Kembs
 Les planqués du régiment (1983) - Le médecin-chef
 On l'appelle Catastrophe (1983) - Frumigaci
 L'émir préfère les blondes (1983) - McGorell
 Les Rois du gag (1985, by Claude Zidi) - Jean
 Dressage (1986) - Le valet
 Le diable rose (1988) - Monsieur Maurice
 Overseas (1990) - Oncle Alban

1919 births
2009 deaths
French humorists
Male actors from Paris
French male film actors
French male television actors
French male stage actors
Burials at Père Lachaise Cemetery
French male writers
20th-century French male writers